Laevius (died c. 80 BC?) was a Latin poet, of whom practically nothing is known.

The earliest reference to him is perhaps in Suetonius (De grammaticis, 3), though it is not certain that the "Laevius Milissus" there referred to is the same person. Definite references do not occur before the 2nd century (Fronto, Ep. ad ~k~. Caes. i. 3; Aulus Gellius, Noct. Att. i~. 24, Xii. 10, XjX. 9 Apuleius, De magic, 30; Porphyrion, Ad Horat. carm. iii. 1, 2).

Some sixty miscellaneous lines are preserved (see Bährens, Fragm. poet. rom. pp. 287–293), from which it is difficult to see how ancient critics could have regarded him as the master of Ovid or Catullus. Gellius and Ausonius state that he composed an Erotopaegnia, and in other sources he is credited with Adonis, Alcestis, Centaurs, Helena, Ino, Protesilaudamia, Sirenocirca, and Phoenix, which may, however, be only the parts of the Erotopaegnia. They were not serious poems, but light and often licentious skits on the heroic myths.

References
 O. Ribbeck, Geschichte der römischen Dichtung, i.
 H. de la Ville de Mirmont, Étude biographique et littéraire sur le poète Laevius (Paris, 1900), with critical edition of the fragments, and remarks on vocabulary and syntax
 A. Weichert, Poetarum latinorum reliquiae (Leipzig, 1830)
 M. Schanz, Geschichte der römischen Literatur (2nd ed), pt. i. p. 163
 W. Teuffel, Hist. of Roman Literature (Eng. tr.), 150, 4
 summary in F. Plessis, La Poésie latine (1909), pp. 139–142.
 

Ancient Roman poets
Old Latin-language writers
1st-century BC Roman poets
1st-century BC Romans